Glenthorne is a 13.3 hectare geological Site of Special Scientific Interest in the parish of Oare within the Exmoor National Park, on the border of Somerset and Devon, notified in 1989.

Glenthorne is a Geological Conservation Review site because of the Trentishoe Formation of the Hangman Sandstone Group. The Hangman Sandstone represents the Middle Devonian sequence of North Devon and Somerset. These are unusual freshwater deposits in the Hangman Grits, which were mainly formed in desert conditions.

References

External links

 English Nature website (SSSI information)

Sites of Special Scientific Interest in Devon
Sites of Special Scientific Interest in Somerset
Sites of Special Scientific Interest notified in 1989
Geology of Devon
Geology of Somerset